is a Japanese professional wrestler currently working for the Japanese professional wrestling promotion Pro Wrestling Wave.

Professional wrestling career

Independent circuit (1995-present)
Miyazaki made her professional wrestling debut on January 8, 1995, at a house show promoted by Japanese Women Pro-Wrestling Project, where she fought Tomoko Kuzumi in a time-limit draw. She participated in a 50-women gauntlet match at OZ Academy/Manami Toyota Produce Manami Toyota 30th Anniversary, Manami Toyota's retirement show produced by Oz Academy on November 3, 2017, where she was the 12th woman to get pinned. She participated at Dynamite Kansai's retirement show too, at OZ Academy/Dynamite Kansai Produce Farewell Dynamite Kansai from December 11, 2016, where she teamed up with Kaori Yoneyama and Aoi Kizuki to defeat Bachiko, Reika and Command Bolshoi in a six-woman tag team match. She is known for her tenure with Seadlinnng, promotion for which she wrestled at events such as Seadlinnng Fortissimo from May 24, 2017, where she teamed up with Nanae Takahashi in a losing effort to Aja Kong and Mika Akino. Miyazaki participated in the AAA Lucha Libre Victoria World Cup 2016, an event produced by Lucha Libre AAA Worldwide, where she teamed up with Aja Kong and Natsu Sumire, representing Team Japan and facing Team Canada (Taya Valkyrie, Allie and K. C. Spinelli) in the semi-final of the tournament on June 3. They lost to Team Mexico (Faby Apache, Mari Apache and Lady Apache) in the final of the tournament on June 5. At Assemble Vol. 4, an event produced by Women's Pro-Wrestling Assemble on March 6, 2021, Miyazaki fought Yumi Ohka, Nagisa Nozaki and Sakura Hirota in a four-way match. Miyazaki is a former multiple time Ironman Heavymetalweight Champion, and one milestone event where she competed for it was on March 11, 2007, at the DDT 10th Anniversary: Judgement 2007 event promoted by Dramatic Dream Team where she faced Exciting Yoshida, Fushicho Karasu, Kikutaro, Naoshi Sano and Taneichi Kacho in a 5 Minute + α Minute Limitless Battle Royal for the title.

NEO Japan Pro Wrestling (1999-present)
At NEO The Last Holy Fight In KINEMA  from November 28, 2010, Miyazaki teamed up with her long time tag team partner Tanny Mouse to defeat Aya Yuuki and Ryo Mizunami for the NEO Tag Team Championship.

Championships and accomplishments
All Japan Women's Pro-Wrestling
AJW Tag Team Championship (1 time) - with Tanny Mouse
Dramatic Dream Team/DDT Pro-Wrestling
Ironman Heavymetalweight Championship (15 times)
Ice Ribbon
International Ribbon Tag Team Championship (1 time, inaugural) - with Tanny Mouse
Japanese Women Pro-Wrestling Project
JWP Korakuen Tag Team Championship (1 time) - with Tomoko Kuzumi
JWP Awards
Best Bout Award (2003)
NEO Japan Ladies Pro-Wrestling
NEO Tag Team Championship (2 times) - with Tanny Mouse
NEO Itabashi Tag Team Championship (6 times) - with Tanny Mouse
NEO Kitazawa Tag Team Championship (4 times) - with Tanny Mouse
NEO Hall Of Fame (2010)
Pro Wrestling Wave
Wave Tag Team Championship (3 times) - with Yumi Ohka, Nagisa Nozaki and Sakura Hirota

References 

1979 births
Living people
Japanese female professional wrestlers
People from Anjō
20th-century professional wrestlers
21st-century professional wrestlers
Ironman Heavymetalweight Champions